Furu is a Central Sudanic language of the Democratic Republic of the Congo. Glottolog has it as one of the Kara languages, in line with recent literature, while Blench (2012) follows older lit in listing it as a Kresh language.

References

Bibliography
Blench (2000 ms)

Central Sudanic languages
Languages of the Democratic Republic of the Congo
Bongo–Bagirmi languages